Ya Zahra (Persian: یا زهراء, O Zahra) is an Iranian unlicensed  copy of the HQ-7, itself an unlicensed copy of the French Crotale missile short-range air defense system. The system entered production in 2013.

The Ya Zahra differs from Iran's Raad in being a short-range air defense system. Iranian sources say it is able to form a  missile defense network. This system was successfully tested in "Defenders of Velayat Skies 4" air defense drills. Iranian sources claim the Ya Zahra is more advanced than the French Crotale.

Mass production of the Ya Zahra air defense system officially began on January 27, 2013.

The 3rd generation of the Ya Zahra system, Ya Zahra-3, has electo-optical equipment that reportedly helps to detect and track targets when the battlefield is affected by heavy jamming. Also Ya Zahra has a full mobile version named Herz-e-Nohom.

The missile used by the system is the Shahab Thaqeb. It has been under development since at least 2011.

Comparable SAMs
Crotale
HQ-7

See also 
Bavar 373
Mersad
Sayyad-2

References 

Surface-to-air missiles of Iran
21st-century surface-to-air missiles
Guided missiles of Iran
Military equipment introduced in the 2010s